Celestial marriage (also called the New and Everlasting Covenant of Marriage, Eternal Marriage, Temple Marriage) is a doctrine that marriage can last forever in heaven. This is a unique teaching of the Church of Jesus Christ of Latter-day Saints (LDS Church)  or Mormonism, and branches of Mormon fundamentalism.

In the LDS Church
Within the LDS Church, family relationships can be sealed, thereby continuing beyond death, via the sealing ordinance. The ordinance is associated with a covenant that takes place inside temples by those authorized to hold the sealing power.  The only people allowed to enter the temple, be married there, or attend these sealings are those who hold an official temple recommend. Obtaining a temple recommend requires one to abide by LDS Church doctrine and be interviewed and considered worthy by their bishop and stake president. A prerequisite to contracting an eternal marriage, in addition to obtaining a temple recommend, involves undergoing the temple endowment, which involves making of covenants of obedience and devotion to God and his commandments.

To receive the promised blessings of the sealing covenant, one must fulfill his or her promise to be obedient to all the Lord's commandments, including living a clean chaste life, abstaining from any impure thing, willing to sacrifice and consecrate all that one has for the Lord. In the marriage ceremony, a man and a woman make covenants to God and to each other and are said to be sealed as husband and wife for time and all eternity.
In the 19th century, the term "celestial marriage" usually referred to the practice of plural marriage, a practice which the LDS Church formally abandoned in 1890. The term is still used in this sense by Mormon fundamentalists not affiliated with the LDS Church.

In the LDS Church today, both men and women may enter a celestial marriage with only one living partner at a time. A man may be sealed to more than one woman. If his wife dies, he may enter another celestial marriage, and be sealed to both his living wife and deceased wife or wives. Many Mormons believe that all these marriages will be valid in the eternities and the husband will live together in the celestial kingdom as a family with all to whom he was sealed. In 1998, the LDS Church changed the policy and now also allows women to be sealed to more than one man. A woman, however, may not be sealed to more than one man at a time while she is alive. She may only be sealed to subsequent partners after she has died. Proxy sealings, like proxy baptisms, are offered to the person in the afterlife. According to church teachings, the celestial marriage covenant, as with other covenants, requires the continued righteousness of the couple to remain in effect after this life. If only one remains righteous that person is promised a righteous eternal companion in eternity.

New Testament

In , Jesus is asked about the continuing state of marriage after death and he replies that after the resurrection of the dead, "people will neither marry nor be given in marriage; they will be like the angels in heaven." Mormons do not interpret Jesus' statement as meaning "that marriages will not exist after the Resurrection, but that marriages will not be performed after the Resurrection; for all questions of marital status must be settled before that time." Thus, Mormons believe that only mortals can be the subject of an eternal marriage ordinance; mortals may receive the ordinance for themselves or by proxy for those who have already died.

Sealing

Celestial marriage is an instance of the LDS Church doctrine of sealing. Following a celestial marriage, not only are the couple sealed as husband and wife, but children born into the marriage are also sealed to that family. In cases where the husband and wife have been previously married civilly and there are already children from their union, the children accompany their parents to the temple and are sealed to their parents following the marriage ceremony.

LDS Church members believe that through this sealing, the family, constituted of a man, wife, and children will live together forever, if obedient to God's commandments.

Relationship to plural marriage

There is substantial doctrinal dispute between the LDS Church and its offshoots as to whether celestial marriage is plural or monogamous. Some critics argue that the official Mormon scripture, Doctrine and Covenants section 132, which describes celestial marriage, specifies that only plural marriages qualify. Others argue that the text indicates "a wife", which would mean that any temple sealing ordinance of marriage could qualify. The latter view is supported by the official History of the Church, which indicates that marriage for eternity was monogamous except in "some circumstances":

[I]t is borne in mind that at this time the new law of marriage for the Church—marriage for eternity, including plurality of wives under some circumstances—was being introduced by the Prophet [Joseph Smith], it is very likely that the following article was written with a view of applying the principles here expounded to the conditions created by introducing said marriage system.

In the following quote, apostle Lorenzo Snow, who later became president of the LDS Church, refers to "celestial plural marriage" rather than simply "celestial marriage":

He knew the voice of God—he knew the commandment of the Almighty to him was to go forward—to set the example, and establish Celestial plural marriage. He knew that he had not only his own prejudices and pre-possessions to combat and to overcome, but those of the whole Christian world...; but God ... had given the commandment.  Nevertheless, it is correct that "celestial marriage" was often used to refer to plural marriage.

Mormon fundamentalists cleave to the view that there is no celestial marriage that is not plural, while the LDS Church claims otherwise. As viewed by the LDS Church, plural marriages in the early church, when properly authorized and conducted, were, in fact, celestial marriages; but celestial marriages need not be plural marriages. In addition, since celestial marriages must be performed by someone with proper priesthood authority, and since plural marriage is no longer authorized by the LDS Church, no authorized celestial plural marriages can be performed today. Mormon fundamentalists argue, in return, that they have retained the priesthood authority to perform these marriages.

Swedenborg

A concept of celestial marriage was described by Emanuel Swedenborg as early as 1749. Swedenborg's Latin term conjugium coeleste was translated as "celestial marriage" by John Clowes in 1782.  Two more recent translators have preferred the term "heavenly marriage." In all his authoritative writing, Swedenborg only mentions the term celestial marriage twice.<ref>Arcana Coelestia’’ 162</ref>

Swedenborg defined the celestial marriage or heavenly marriage as the marriage of love with wisdom or of goodness with truth. He wrote, "Truth and good joined together is what is called the celestial marriage, which constitutes heaven itself with a person." Swedenborg does not use "celestial marriage" to refer to the marriage of husband and wife, although he says that the marriage of husband and wife has its origin in the heavenly or celestial marriage of goodness and truth.

According to Swedenborg, true married love forms an eternal bond, an actual joining together of minds, so that married partners who truly love each other are not separated by death but continue to be married to eternity. He writes that this love is "celestial, spiritual, holy pure and clean above every love which exists from the Lord with angels of heaven and people in the church." None can come into this love, he says, but those who are monogamous and "who go to the Lord and love the truths of the church and do the good things it teaches."

Craig Miller has investigated the possibility that Swedenborg influenced Joseph Smith, as there are similarities between some of their teachings. He concludes that Smith may have learned something about Swedenborg through third parties, but was unlikely to have read much if any of Swedenborg's works for himself. Among Smith's connections was Sarah M. Cleveland, who was married to a Swedenborgian at the time of her plural marriage to Smith in 1842. It was shortly afterwards, in July 1843, that Smith recorded receiving a revelation regarding eternal marriage in Doctrine and Covenants 132.

See also

 Posthumous marriage in Mormonism

Notes

References

.
.
.
. A multi-part series of articles in which Orson Pratt describes his view of the relationship between celestial marriage and polygamy in the 1800s. Complete series in PDF available here (26MB). This work was never accepted as official doctrine of The Church of Jesus Christ of Latter-day Saints.
.
.
.

External links
 The Family: A Proclamation To The World - a formal statement on marriage and family from the LDS Church
 mormon.org/family - LDS Church views on the family and marriage
 Before Marriage
 Wisdom's Delight in Marriage ("Conjugial") Love: Followed by Insanity’s Pleasure in Promiscuous Love (Swedenborg Society 1953) Swedenborg's book on the spiritual relationships between the sexes, both ideal and disorderly
 Death in Swedenborian and Mormon Eschatology'' Mary Ann Meyers

Latter Day Saint concepts of the afterlife
Latter Day Saint ordinances, rituals, and symbolism
Latter Day Saint temple practices
Latter Day Saint terms
Marriage in Mormonism
Mormonism and polygamy
Sexuality and Mormonism
Types of marriage